This article lists the Sri Lanka women's national football team fixtures and results.

2010

2012

2014

2015

2016

2019

2022 

Sri Lanka women's national football team
Women's national association football team results